Death on a Bitch is the second solo album by American rapper Messy Marv.

Track listing

External links
 

1999 albums
Messy Marv albums
Gangsta rap albums by American artists